Chelsfield railway station is on the South Eastern Main Line, serving the Chelsfield and Green Street Green areas south of Orpington, in the London Borough of Bromley, south-east London. It is in Travelcard Zone 6.

The line on which it is located, and the station itself, was opened on 2 March 1868 by the South Eastern Railway to shorten its route from London to Dover. The building of the route, which crosses the North Downs, was a difficult undertaking, with steep gradients. At Chelsfield the line is rising steadily on a 1 in 120 gradient through the Chelsfield Tunnel beyond the station. It is said that this was an inspiration to E. Nesbit when writing The Railway Children.

The modern station building dates from the 1970s when its predecessor was damaged by fire.

Services 

The typical off-peak service in trains per hour is:
 2 tph to London Charing Cross via  and 
 2 tph to 

Connections
London Buses routes R1 and 654 serve the station.

References

External links 

Railway stations in the London Borough of Bromley
DfT Category D stations
Former South Eastern Railway (UK) stations
Railway stations in Great Britain opened in 1868
Railway stations served by Southeastern